Thomas Bainbridge may refer to:

 Thomas Bainbrigg (died 1646), or Bainbridge, English college head
 Thomas Bainbridge (politician) (1831–1901), member of the Wisconsin State Assembly